Elmsthorpe may refer to:
Elmesthorpe, a village in the United Kingdom
Rural Municipality of Elmsthorpe No. 100, Saskatchewan, Canada